Øystein Mellerud (6 July 1938 – 27 November 1989) was a Norwegian ice hockey player. He played for the Norwegian national ice hockey team, and  participated at the Winter Olympics in 1964, where he placed tenth with the Norwegian team.

References

External links

1938 births
1989 deaths
Ice hockey players at the 1964 Winter Olympics
Norwegian ice hockey players
Olympic ice hockey players of Norway
Ice hockey people from Oslo